Kraton Kanoman is a palace in the Indonesian city of Cirebon in West Java.
It was founded by Sultan Anom I in 1677. In the outer area of the palace, the siti inggil, are masonry versions of the classic Javanese pendopo form, as opposed to the more conventional timber structures. Like the Great Mosque in Demak, Chinese ceramics are embedded into the plastered walls. The squat split-gates with pyramidal peaks are a Cirebon emblem.

See also
 Indonesian architecture
 Sultanate of Cirebon
 List of monarchs of Java
 List of palaces in Indonesia

References
 Schoppert, P., Damais, S., Java Style, 1997, Didier Millet, Paris, pp. 46–47, 

Buildings and structures in Cirebon
Palaces in Java
Tourist attractions in West Java
1677 establishments in Indonesia